"Borders and Time" is a song recorded by Canadian music group The Rankin Family. It was released in 1994 as the third single from their third studio album, North Country. It peaked in the top 10 on the RPM Adult Contemporary Tracks chart.

Chart performance

Year-end charts

References

1993 songs
1994 singles
The Rankin Family songs
EMI Records singles
Songs written by Jimmy Rankin